The Côte d'Azur Championships also called the Championship of the Côte d'Azur was a men's  and women's international clay court tennis tournament held at the Cannes Lawn Tennis Club, Cannes, Provence-Alpes-Côte d'Azur, France from 1909 through to 1939. It was one of the main tournaments on the French Riviera tennis circuit.

History
Cannes Lawn Tennis Club, was formally established in 1907. In 1910 it began to host the Côte d'Azur Championships an international clay court tennis tournament that was staged until the start of World War II. It was one of the main tournaments that formed part of the French Riviera circuit.

Finals

Mens Singles

Women's Singles

References

Sources
 Albert Lejeune, ed. (March 31, 1930). "Tennis sur la Cote D'Azur" [Tennis at the Cote D'Azur]. Le Petit Niçois (in French). Nice, France. 
 American Lawn Tennis. New York: American Lawn Tennis Publishing Company. 1939. 
 Staff Writers. "1877 to 2012 Finals Results". Steve G Tennis. stevegtennis.com. 
 Steinhart, J. (1925). Le Voyageur en France. Paris: French Government Tourist Office.
 TenX Tennis Directory. North Sydney, NSW, Australia: Tenx Pro.

Clay court tennis tournaments
Defunct tennis tournaments in France